Aarhus Central Station is the main railway station serving the city of Aarhus, Denmark. Serving as the main connecting hub for rail traffic between Aarhus and the rest of Denmark, the station is used by an average of 6.3 million people per year, making it the busiest station in Denmark outside the Copenhagen area. It is located in the city centre between the districts of Midtbyen and Frederiksbjerg with entrances from Banegårdspladsen and the shopping centre Bruun's Galleri, and with access to platforms from M.P. Bruuns Gade.

It is a through station with 4 platforms. The station is located on the East Jutland railway, and is the terminus of the Grenaa Line and Odder Line. It offers international connections to Hamburg and Berlin, InterCity connections to Aalborg/Frederikshavn and Copenhagen, regional connections to the rest of Jutland as well as light rail services to Grenå and Odder. The train services are operated by DSB, Arriva and Deutsche Bahn.

History
The Danish railway network reached Aarhus in 1862 with the construction of the railway line from Aarhus to Randers, built by the British civil engineering company Peto, Brassey and Betts. The city's first railway station opened on 2 September 1862 to serve as the southern terminus of this new line. It was located near Ryesgade, and encompassed administration buildings and railway works.

In 1884, a new and larger station building was constructed. The second station was built in Neo-Renaissance style by Thomas Arboe and William August Thulstrup and was possibly inspired by Bonn Central Station.

However, also this building turned out to be to small for the quickly developing city. The third and current Aarhus Central Station was built in 1927 by the Danish State Railway's architect K.T. Seest as a part of a plan of the whole area around the station.

Station facilities
The station itself houses a large ticket kiosk, public toilets, a McDonald's restaurant, two 7-Eleven's, and a couple of other shops, but the station building is also combined with a three-storey shopping centre (Bruun's Galleri) housing 93 stores, restaurants and cafés and a large underground car park. The upper deck of the groundfloor train station holds a shopping arcade (Bruuns Arkade) with more restaurants, and a two-storey bike parking facility.

The square outside the station (Banegårdsplads) has a taxi hub, a bike-share facility, a pharmacy, a money transfer and exchange store, and more shops, kiosks, cafés and eateries.

The railway terminal has a flow of 13 million people per year.

Operations
Aarhus Central Station serves the whole of Denmark with inter-city rail and Jutland with regional rail. The regional connections include Herning/Skjern in the west and Struer in the northwest.

Aarhus Light Rail with electric trams opened its first line from Aarhus Central Station in December 2017. It connects with Aarhus University Hospital (DNU) in Skejby. In 2018, a southward suburban rail line to Odder opened, and a northbound section to Grenaa is scheduled for 2019. More local expansions of the system are planned for the near future.

Services
The following services currently call at the station:

Intercity services Frederikshavn–Hjoerring–Aalborg–Aarhus–Fredericia–Odense–Copenhagen–Copenhagen Airport
Regional services Aarhus–Horsens–Fredericia–Kolding–Esbjerg
Regional services Herning–Silkeborg–Aarhus
Local services Struer–Skive–Viborg–Aarhus
Local services Skjern–Herning–Silkeborg–Aarhus
Light rail/tramway Odder–Aarhus–Lisbjergskolen/Lystrup
Light rail/tramway Odder–Aarhus–Skødstrup–Ryomgård–Grenaa

Gallery

References

Citations

Bibliography

Further reading

External links

 Banedanmark – government agency responsible for maintenance and traffic control of most of the Danish railway network
 DSB – largest Danish train operating company
 Arriva – British multinational public transport company operating bus and train services in Denmark
 Danske Jernbaner – website with information on railway history in Denmark

Buildings and structures in Aarhus
Railway stations in Aarhus
Railway stations opened in 1927
1862 establishments in Denmark
Knud Tanggaard Seest railway stations
Transit centers in Denmark
Railway stations in Denmark opened in the 20th century